Third-wave feminism is a feminist movement that began in the early 1990s, prominent in the decades prior to the fourth wave. Grounded in the civil-rights advances of the second wave, Gen X third-wave feminists born in the 1960s and 1970s embraced diversity and individualism in women, and sought to redefine what it meant to be a feminist. The third wave saw the emergence of new feminist currents and theories, such as intersectionality, sex positivity, vegetarian ecofeminism, transfeminism, and postmodern feminism. According to feminist scholar Elizabeth Evans, the "confusion surrounding what constitutes third-wave feminism is in some respects its defining feature."

The third wave is traced to the emergence of the riot grrrl feminist punk subculture in Olympia, Washington, in the early 1990s, and to Anita Hill's televised testimony in 1991 (to an all-male, all-white Senate Judiciary Committee) that African-American judge Clarence Thomas had sexually harassed her. The term third wave is credited to Rebecca Walker, who responded to Thomas's appointment to the Supreme Court with an article in Ms. magazine, "Becoming the Third Wave" (1992). She wrote:

Walker sought to establish that third-wave feminism was not just a reaction, but a movement in itself, because the feminist cause had more work ahead. The term intersectionality—to describe the idea that women experience "layers of oppression" caused, for example, by gender, race and class—had been introduced by Kimberlé Crenshaw in 1989, and it was during the third wave that the concept flourished. As feminists came online in the late 1990s and early 2000s and reached a global audience with blogs and e-zines, they broadened their goals, focusing on abolishing gender-role stereotypes and expanding feminism to include women with diverse racial and cultural identities.

History 

The rights and programs gained by feminists of the second wave served as a foundation for the third wave. The gains included Title IX (equal access to education), public discussion about the abuse and rape of women, access to contraception and other reproductive services (including the legalization of abortion), the creation and enforcement of sexual-harassment policies for women in the workplace, the creation of domestic-abuse shelters for women and children, child-care services, educational funding for young women, and women's studies programs.

Feminist leaders rooted in the second wave such as Gloria E. Anzaldúa, bell hooks, Cherríe Moraga, Audre Lorde, Maxine Hong Kingston, and other feminists of color, sought to negotiate a space within feminist thought for consideration of race. Cherríe Moraga and Gloria E. Anzaldúa had published the anthology This Bridge Called My Back (1981), which, along with All the Women Are White, All the Blacks Are Men, But Some of Us Are Brave (1982), edited by Akasha (Gloria T.) Hull, Patricia Bell-Scott, and Barbara Smith, argued that second-wave feminism had focused primarily on the problems of white women. The emphasis on the intersection between race and gender became increasingly prominent.

In the interlude of the late 1970s and early 1980s, the feminist sex wars arose as a reaction against the radical feminism of the second wave and its views on sexuality, therein countering with a concept of "sex-positivity" and heralding the third wave.

Another crucial point for the start of the third wave is the publication in 1990 of Gender Trouble: Feminism and the Subversion of Identity by Judith Butler, which soon became one of the most influential works of contemporary feminist theory. In it, Butler argued against homogenizing conceptions of "women", which had a normative and exclusionary effect not only in the social world more broadly but also within feminism. This was the case not only for racialized or working-class women, but also for masculine, lesbian or non-binary women. Besides, she outlined her theory of gender as performativity, which posited that gender works by enforcing a series of repetitions of verbal and non-verbal acts that generate the "illusion" of a coherent and intelligible gender expression and identity, which otherwise lack any essential property. Lastly, Butler developed the claim that there is no resource to a "natural" sex, but that what we call such is always already culturally mediated, and therefore inseparable from gender. These views were foundational for the field of queer theory, and played a major role in the development of third-wave feminist theories and practices.

Early years

Riot grrrl

The emergence of riot grrrl, the feminist punk subculture, in the early 1990s in Olympia, Washington, marked the beginning of third-wave feminism. The triple "r" in grrrl was intended to reclaim the word girl for women. Alison Piepmeier writes that riot grrrl and Sarah Dyer's Action Girl Newsletter formulated "a style, rhetoric, and iconography for grrrl zines" that came to define third-wave feminism, and that focused on the viewpoint of adolescent girls. Based on hard-core punk rock, the movement created zines and art, talked about rape, patriarchy, sexuality, and female empowerment, started chapters, and supported and organized women in music. An undatedbut collected by 2013 Bikini Kill tour flier asked "What is Riot grrrl?":

Riot grrrl was grounded in the DIY philosophy of punk values, adopting an anti-corporate stance of self-sufficiency and self-reliance. Its emphasis on universal female identity and separatism often appeared more closely allied with second-wave feminism. Bands associated with the movement included Bratmobile, Excuse 17, Jack Off Jill, Free Kitten, Heavens to Betsy, Huggy Bear, L7, Fifth Column, and Team Dresch, and most prominently Bikini Kill.

Riot grrrl culture gave people the space to enact change on a macro, meso and micro scale. As Kevin Dunn explains:Using the do-it-yourself ethos of punk to provide resources for individual empowerment, Riot Grrrl encouraged females to engage in multiple sites of resistance. At the macro-level, Riot Grrrls resist society's dominant constructions of femininity. At the meso-level, they resist stifling gender roles in punk. At the micro-level, they challenge gender constructions in their families and among their peers.The demise of riot grrrl is linked to commodification and misrepresentation of its message, mainly through media coverage. Writing in Billboard magazine, Jennifer Keishin Armstrong states:

El Hunt of NME states, "Riot grrrl bands in general were very focused on making space for women at gigs. They understood the importance of giving women a platform and voice to speak out against abusers. For a lot of young women and girls, who probably weren't following the Riot grrrl scene at all, The Spice Girls brought this spirit into the mainstream and made it accessible."

Anita Hill

In 1991, Anita Hill, when questioned, accused Clarence Thomas, an African-American judge who had been nominated to the United States Supreme Court, of sexual harassment. Thomas denied the accusations, calling them a "high-tech lynching". After extensive debate, the United States Senate voted 52–48 in favor of Thomas. In response, Ms. Magazine published an article by Rebecca Walker, entitled "Becoming the Third Wave", in which she stated: "I am not a post-feminism feminist. I am the third wave." Many had argued that Thomas should be acquitted because of his plans to create opportunities for people of color. When Walker asked her partner his opinion and he said the same thing, she asked: "When will progressive black men prioritize my rights and well-being?" She wanted racial equality but without dismissing women.

In 1992, dubbed the "Year of the Woman", four women entered the United States Senate to join the two already there. The following year, another woman, Kay Bailey Hutchison, won a special election, bringing the number to seven. The 1990s saw the US's first female Attorney General (Janet Reno) and Secretary of State (Madeleine Albright), as well as the second woman on the Supreme Court, Ruth Bader Ginsburg, and the first US First Lady, Hillary Clinton, to have had an independent political, legal and activist career.

Purpose

Arguably the biggest challenge to third-wave feminism was that the gains of second-wave feminism were taken for granted, and the importance of feminism not understood. Baumgardner and Richards (2000) wrote: "[F]or anyone born after the early 1960s, the presence of feminism in our lives is taken for granted. For our generation, feminism is like fluoride. We scarcely notice that we have it—it's simply in the water."

Essentially the claim was that gender equality had already been achieved, via the first two waves, and further attempts to push for women's rights were irrelevant and unnecessary, or perhaps even pushed the pendulum too far in women's favor. This issue manifested itself in the heated debates about whether affirmative action was creating gender equality or punishing white, middle-class males for the biological history that they had inherited. Third-wave feminism therefore focused on Consciousness raising—"one's ability to open their mind to the fact that male domination does affect the women of our generation, is what we need.

Third-wave feminists often engaged in "micro-politics", and challenged the second wave's paradigm as to what was good for women. Proponents of third-wave feminism said that it allowed women to define feminism for themselves.  Describing third-wave feminism in Manifesta: Young Women, Feminism And The Future (2000), Jennifer Baumgardner and Amy Richards suggested that feminism could change with every generation and individual:

Third-wave feminists used personal narratives as a form of feminist theory. Expressing personal experiences gave women space to recognize that they were not alone in the oppression and discrimination they faced. Using these accounts has benefits because it records personal details that may not be available in traditional historical texts.

Third-wave ideology focused on a more post-structuralist interpretation of gender and sexuality. Post-structuralist feminists saw binaries such as male–female as an artificial construct created to maintain the power of the dominant group. Joan W. Scott wrote in 1998 that "poststructuralists insist that words and texts have no fixed or intrinsic meanings, that there is no transparent or self-evident relationship between them and either ideas or things, no basic or ultimate correspondence between language and the world".

Relationship with second wave
The second wave of feminism is often accused of being elitist and ignoring groups such as women of colour and transgender women, instead, focusing on white, middle class, cisgender women. Third wave feminists questioned the beliefs of their predecessors and began to apply feminist theory to a wider variety of women, who had not been previously included in feminist activity.

Amy Richards defined the feminist culture for the third wave as "third wave because it's an expression of having grown up with feminism". Second-wave feminists grew up where the politics intertwined within the culture, such as "Kennedy, the Vietnam War, civil rights, and women's rights". In contrast, the third wave sprang from a culture of "punk-rock, hip-hop, 'zines, products, consumerism and the Internet". In an essay entitled "Generations, Academic Feminists in dialogue" Diane Elam wrote:

Rebecca Walker, in To Be Real: Telling the Truth and Changing the Face of Feminism (1995), wrote about her fear of rejection by her mother (Alice Walker) and her godmother (Gloria Steinem) for challenging their views:

Issues

Violence against women

Violence against women, including rape, domestic violence, and sexual harassment, became a central issue. Organizations such as V-Day formed with the goal of ending gender violence, and artistic expressions, such as The Vagina Monologues, generated awareness. Third-wave feminists wanted to transform traditional notions of sexuality and embrace "an exploration of women's feelings about sexuality that included vagina-centred topics as diverse as orgasm, birth, and rape".

Reproductive rights

One of third-wave feminism's primary goals was to demonstrate that access to contraception and abortion are women's reproductive rights. According to Baumgardner and Richards, "It is not feminism's goal to control any woman's fertility, only to free each woman to control her own." South Dakota's 2006 attempt to ban abortion in all cases, except when necessary to protect the mother's life, and the US Supreme Court's vote to uphold the partial birth abortion ban were viewed as restrictions on women's civil and reproductive rights. Restrictions on abortion in the US, which was mostly legalized by the 1973 Supreme Court decision in Roe v. Wade, were becoming more common in states around the country. These included mandatory waiting periods, parental-consent laws, and spousal-consent laws.

Reclaiming derogatory terms

English speakers continued to use words such as spinster, bitch, whore, and cunt to refer to women in derogatory ways. Inga Muscio wrote, "I posit that we're free to seize a word that was kidnapped and co-opted in a pain-filled, distant past, with a ransom that cost our grandmothers' freedom, children, traditions, pride and land." Taking back the word bitch was fueled by the single "All Women Are Bitches" (1994) by the all-woman band Fifth Column, and by the book Bitch: In Praise of Difficult Women (1999) by Elizabeth Wurtzel.

The utility of the reclamation strategy became a hot topic with the introduction of SlutWalks in 2011. The first took place in Toronto on 3 April that year in response to a Toronto police officer's remark that "women should avoid dressing like sluts in order not to be victimized." Additional SlutWalks sprang up internationally, including in Berlin, London, New York City, Seattle, and West Hollywood. Several feminist bloggers criticized the campaign; reclamation of the word slut was questioned.

Sexual liberation 
Third-wave feminists expanded the second-wave feminist's definition of sexual liberation to "mean a process of first becoming conscious of the ways one's gender identity and sexuality have been shaped by society and then intentionally constructing (and becoming free to express) one's authentic gender identity". Since third-wave feminism relied on different personal definitions to explain feminism, there is controversy surrounding what sexual liberation really entails. Many third-wave feminists supported the idea that women should embrace their sexuality as a way to take back their power.

Other issues
Third-wave feminism regarded race, social class, and transgender rights as central issues. It also paid attention to workplace matters such as the glass ceiling, unfair maternity-leave policies, motherhood support for single mothers by means of welfare and child care, respect for working mothers, and the rights of mothers who decide to leave their careers to raise their children full-time.

Criticism

Lack of cohesion
One issue raised by critics was a lack of cohesion because of the absence of a single cause for third-wave feminism. The first wave fought for and gained the right for women to vote. The second wave fought for the right for women to have access to an equal opportunity in the workforce, as well as the end of legal sex discrimination. The third wave allegedly lacked a cohesive goal and was often seen as an extension of the second wave. Some argued that the third wave could be dubbed the "Second Wave, Part Two" when it came to the politics of feminism and that "only young feminist culture" was "truly third wave". One argument ran that the equation of third-wave feminism with individualism prevented the movement from growing and moving towards political goals. Kathleen P. Iannello wrote:

Objection to "wave construct"
Feminist scholars such as Shira Tarrant objected to the "wave construct" because it ignored important progress between the periods. Furthermore, if feminism is a global movement, she argued, the fact that the "first-, second-, and third waves time periods correspond most closely to American feminist developments" raises serious problems about how feminism fails to recognize the history of political issues around the world. The "wave construct", critics argued, also focused on white women's suffrage and continued to marginalize the issues of women of color and lower-class women.

Relationship with women of color
Third-wave feminists proclaim themselves as the most inclusive wave of feminism. Critics have noted that while progressive, there is still exclusion of women of color. Black feminists argue that "the women rights movements were not uniquely for the liberation of Blacks or Black Women. Rather, efforts such as women's suffrage and abolition of slavery ultimately uplifted, strengthened, and benefited White society and White women".

"Girly" feminism
Third-wave feminism was often associated, primarily by its critics, with the emergence of so-called "lipstick" or "girly" feminists and the rise of "raunch culture". This was because these new feminists advocated "expressions of femininity and female sexuality as a challenge to objectification". Accordingly, this included the dismissal of any restriction, whether deemed patriarchal or feminist, to define or control how women or girls should dress, act, or generally express themselves. These emerging positions stood in stark contrast with the anti-pornography strains of feminism prevalent in the 1980s. Second-wave feminism viewed pornography as encouraging violence towards women. The new feminists posited that the ability to make autonomous choices about self-expression could be an empowering act of resistance, not simply internalized oppression.

Such views were critiqued because of the subjective nature of empowerment and autonomy. Scholars were unsure whether empowerment was best measured as an "internal feeling of power and agency" or as an external "measure of power and control". Moreover they critiqued an over-investment in "a model of free will and choice" in the marketplace of identities and ideas. Regardless, the "girly" feminists attempted to be open to all different selves while maintaining a dialogue about the meaning of identity and femininity in the contemporary world.

Third-wave feminists said that these viewpoints should not be limited by the label "girly" feminism or regarded as simply advocating "raunch culture". Rather, they sought to be inclusive of the many diverse roles women fulfill. Gender scholars  and Liesbet van Zoonen highlighted this inclusivity by looking at the politicization of women's clothing choices and how the "controversial sartorial choices of girls" and women are constituted in public discourse as "a locus of necessary regulation". Thus the "hijab" and the "belly shirt", as dress choices, were both identified as requiring regulation but for different reasons. Both caused controversy, while appearing to be opposing forms of self-expression. Through the lens of "girly" feminists, one can view both as symbolic of "political agency and resistance to objectification". The "hijab" could be seen as an act of resistance against Western ambivalence towards Islamic identity, and the "belly shirt" an act of resistance against patriarchal society's narrow views of female sexuality. Both were regarded as valid forms of self-expression.

Timeline

1990s

2000s

Notes

References

Bibliography

Further reading

 
 

 
 
 
 Heywood, Leslie L., ed. (2005). The Women's Movement Today: An Encyclopedia of Third-Wave Feminism. 2 vols. Westport: Greenwood Press.
  Pdf.

Suggested listening
 Bikini Kill - The C.D. Version of the First Two Records (Kill Rock Stars) (1994)
 Heavens to Betsy - Calculated (Kill Rock Stars) (1992)
 Huggy Bear - Our Troubled Youth EP [appears on the Yeah Yeah Yeah Yeah split LP with Bikini Kill] (Kill Rock Stars) (1993)
 Alanis Morissette - Jagged Little Pill (Maverick/Reprise) (1995)
 Liz Phair - Exile in Guyville (Matador) (1993)

External links 
 "Becoming the Third Wave" by Rebecca Walker
 interview with Rebecca Walker in Satya Magazine
 Interview with Jennifer Baumgardner and Amy Richards

 
1990s establishments in the United States
Feminism and history
History of women's rights in the United States

de:Feminismus#Dritte Welle